Magoffin may refer to:

People
Andy Magoffin, Canadian musician and record producer
Beriah Magoffin (1815–1885), American politician, Governor of Kentucky, and brother of Ebenezer Magoffin
Ebenezer Magoffin (1817-1865), Confederate officer and brother of Beriah Magoffin
Paul Magoffin (1883–1956), American football player
Ralph Van Deman Magoffin (1874–1942), American academic
Steve Magoffin (born 1979), Australian cricketer
Susan Shelby Magoffin (1827–1855), American diarist

Places
Magoffin County, Kentucky
Magoffin Homestead, El Paso, Texas

Other uses
USS Magoffin (APA-199), a US Navy attack transport

See also
MacGuffin
Maguffin